The Academy of Medical Royal Colleges (AoMRC) is the coordinating body for the United Kingdom and Ireland's 24 Medical Royal Colleges and  Faculties. It ensures that patients are safely and properly cared for by setting standards for the way doctors are educated, trained and monitored throughout their careers. The presidents of these organisations meeting regularly to agree direction.

Established in 1974 as the Conference of medical Royal Colleges and their Faculties, it was renamed the Academy of Medical Royal Colleges in 1996.

It has established one Faculty of its own – The Faculty of Medical Leadership and Management (FMLM), which is jointly administered by the Royal Colleges of Physicians and of General Practitioners.

List of chairs of the Academy of Medical Royal Colleges

The Chair is the elected head of the Academy of Medical Royal Colleges. Their term of officer is up to three years.

 Dame Fiona Caldicott 1996
 Professor Narendra Babubhai Patel 1997
 Professor Roderick Norman McIver MacSween
 Professor Sir Alan Craft (2004 to 2007)
Professor Dame Carol Black (2007 to 2009)
Professor Sir Neil Douglas (2009 to 2012)
 Professor Terence Stephenson (2012 to 2015)
 Professor Dame Susan Bailey (2015 to 2017)
Professor Carrie MacEwen (2017 to 2020)
Professor Helen Stokes-Lampard (2020 to present)

Committees & other subgroups 
 Academy Education Committee
 Academy Foundation Programme Committee
 Academy Specialty Training Committee
 Academy Assessment Committee
 Academy Trainee Doctors' Group
 Academy Patient/Lay Group
 Academy Infection Training Working Party
 Academy Project Governance Committee
 Academy Health Inequalities Forum
 Academy Specialty and Associate Specialist (SAS) Committee
 UK Donations Ethics Committee
 Revalidation Project Governance Committee
 Directors of Continuing Professional Development
 International Forum

Members 
 Faculty of Dental Surgery
 Faculty of Intensive Care Medicine
 Faculty of Occupational Medicine
 Faculty of Pharmaceutical Medicine
 Faculty of Public Health
 Faculty of Sexual and Reproductive Healthcare
 Faculty of Sport and Exercise Medicine
 Royal College of Anaesthetists
 Royal College of Emergency Medicine
 Royal College of General Practitioners
 Royal College of Obstetricians and Gynaecologists
 Royal College of Ophthalmologists
 Royal College of Paediatrics and Child Health
 Royal College of Pathologists
 Royal College of Physicians of Edinburgh
 Royal College of Physicians of Ireland
 Royal College of Physicians of London
 Royal College of Physicians and Surgeons of Glasgow
 Royal College of Psychiatrists
 Royal College of Radiologists
 Royal College of Surgeons in Ireland
 Royal College of Surgeons of Edinburgh
 Royal College of Surgeons of England

There is a separate Scottish organisation: The Academy of Medical Royal Colleges and Faculties in Scotland.

See also
 Medical royal colleges

References

External links 
 

Educational institutions established in 1974
London Borough of Islington
Medical associations based in the United Kingdom
Organisations based in the London Borough of Islington
Professional associations based in the United Kingdom
1974 establishments in the United Kingdom
Royal colleges